Samuel Pennington Thavarasa Tambimuttu was a Sri Lankan Tamil lawyer, politician and Member of Parliament.

Early life and family
Tambimuttu was born in 1932. He was the grand nephew of E. R. Tambimuttu, member of the State Council of Ceylon. He was married to Kala, daughter of Senator M. Manickam. They had a son Arun.

Tambimuttu was a Methodist.

Career
Tambimuttu was a proctor and practiced law in Batticaloa. He was chairman of Batticaloa Citizen's Committee. In this capacity he would intervene on behalf of youths arrested by the paramilitary Special Task Force.

Tambimuttu had been a member of the Tamil United Liberation Front for a long time. He contested the 1989 parliamentary election as one of the Eelam People's Revolutionary Liberation Front's candidates in Batticaloa District and was elected to Parliament.

Tambimuttu was assassinated on 7 May 1990 outside the Canadian High Commission in Colombo. His wife Kala died on 16 May as a result of injuries sustained in the assassination. The assassination was blamed on the rebel Liberation Tigers of Tamil Eelam.

References

1932 births
1990 deaths
Ceylonese proctors
Eelam People's Revolutionary Liberation Front politicians
Members of the 9th Parliament of Sri Lanka
Assassinated Sri Lankan politicians
People from Batticaloa
People killed during the Sri Lankan Civil War
Sri Lankan Methodists
Sri Lankan Tamil lawyers
Sri Lankan Tamil politicians
Tamil United Liberation Front politicians